Rick F. G. Kasper (born 1951 or 1952) is a retired bricklayer and stonemason, and former political figure in British Columbia. He represented Malahat-Juan de Fuca in the Legislative Assembly of British Columbia from 1991 to 2001 as a New Democratic Party (NDP) and then Independent member.

He was educated as a bricklayer at the Pacific Vocational Institute. Kasper represented Langford on the Capital Regional District Board for nine years. In the provincial assembly, he served as parliamentary secretary to several ministers. Kasper was defeated by Brian Kerr when he ran for reelection as an independent in 2001. He served as councillor for Sooke from 2005 to 2008 and was elected again in 2011.

References 

Year of birth missing (living people)
Living people
British Columbia New Democratic Party MLAs
Stonemasons